Polydamasium is a genus of beetles in the family Carabidae, containing the following species:

 Polydamasium anomalum (Darlington, 1968)
 Polydamasium strandi Liebke, 1938

References

Lebiinae